Two Japanese warships have borne the name Hato:

 , a  launched in 1903 and stricken in 1923
 , an  launched in 1937 and sunk in 1944

Imperial Japanese Navy ship names
Japanese Navy ship names